The Pavilhão Acácias Rubras is an Angolan indoor sporting arena located in Benguela.  The arena, built on the occasion of the 2007 Afrobasket along with the Pavilhão Nossa Senhora do Monte in Lubango, Pavilhão Serra Van-Dúnem in Huambo and the Pavilhão do Tafe in Cabinda, has a 2,100-seat capacity.

See also
 Pavilhão N. Sra do Monte
 Pavilhão Serra Van-Dúnem
 Pavilhão do Tafe

References

Benguela
Buildings and structures in Benguela